Evelyn is the stage name of Jorge Perez, an Argentine female impersonator who rose to proéminence in the 1980’s.

Early life
Jorge Pérez is a third generation artist. His mother Hilda Dehil was a Las Vegas style musicals star and his grand mother Anita Bobasso an actress. Jorge inherit from both his artistic talent. Being only 18 years old, he was in a musical show named "Verdisimo" in Popea. This musical was followed by the revue show Las Vegas style called "Los Vecinos de Corrientes", directed by Edgardo Cane and produced by Argentinian journalist Leo Vanés. The producer Antonio Prat invited Evelyn to starring a revue named "Una Noche de Locura" ( A crazy evening) with the comedian Alberto Locati and the Argentinian folkloric ballet named "Argentina Trio" in a tour that lasted several months around the country. 
A year later, Gerardo Sofovich, the Argentinian producer, selected Evelyn as the attraction for his musical production called "Corrientes de Lujo", in Sans Souci music hall. This Theater was considered as the closest Argentinian version to Le Lido of Paris. It was located in the entertainment venue in Buenos Aires Avenida Corrientes. In this musical, Evelyn shared the stage with Betty Lascaris, who was a dancer of the Moulin Rouge of Paris. Other Argentinian artists acting on this musical were Estela Raval, Marty Cosens and Chico Novarro. As a result of this musical, Evelyn quickly became part of the news in the magazines as showing in the pages 76 and 77 of Gente y la actualidad published by Editorial Atlántida, and Magazine siete dias both magazines specializing in the show business. The militaries, also known as the dirty war took over the Argentinian government. Evelyn was supposed to starring a movie with a well-known Argentinian comedian Alberto Olmedo. The film was named " My girlfriend the transvestite". The military censor did not allow to use the world transvestite in the movie name, and it ended up being named "My girlfriend him"...As soon as the military censorship realized that a real transvestite was the star of the movie furiously let the producer know that "he will not allow a man dressed as a woman in the movie", ( but he did allow the actress that replaced Evelyn to dress as a man). It was that made Jorge to decide to leave his country seeing that there was no chance of progress..Miguel Paulino Tato, is considered the highest censor in the history of Argentine cinema from August 1974 to March 24, 1976, during the presidency of María Estela Martínez de Perón; and from there until the end of 1980, during the civic-military dictatorship.
The prestigious publication Page 12 from Buenos Aires, have featured Evelyn in its cover on January 2023, with 2 pages inside dedicated to the narrative of the Evelyn frustrated career.

Career

A tour for all over Latin America with an stop in Rio de Janeiro, Brazil for a successful press conference was followed by the musical in Caracas, Venezuela a country that wide opened their arms to receive Evelyn. Soon he become the center o the press showing in the cover of all Venezuelan magazines. He did there two musicals "Noche de Gala" and "Gran Variety a lo Riviera", produced by Joaquin Riviera, both productions lasted for a full year.Libertad Leblanc an Argentinian movie star who is Jorge's friend, suggested to Evelyn do not miss Europe.  Libertad screamed to the press in Europe: "soon there will be arriving Evelyn, an stage artist produced in America, be ready to enjoy him"...The public, producers and press critics that assisted to the Evelyn Show presentation in Cerebros Music Hall in Madrid, Spain, (a presentation just for the media), was impressed by Jorge's stage talent, that a week later he was in the cover of the Magazine Chiss. They called Evelyn to be the successor of the English Actor Danny La Rue, and a contract followed the presentation for performing in European cities that lasted for 3 years, named International Evelyn Show. EVELYN performed in several Music Halls all over Europe including private millionaire's parties at the Costa del Sol, discothèques and Theatres. After a successful tour in Italy, Jorge Perez Evelyn received the Riccione award as a foreign actor, with Walter Chiari as a national actor.
America claimed Evelyn back in the 1999s, and after a long tour that lasted several years in Miami, Las Vegas and New York City shows, Jorge decided to put a stop to his career and settle in New York City and Long Island, to help develop his lifetime partner Rodolfo Valentin
 his career. A chain of hair salons was opened in the New York City and Long Island NY area. As a result, Jorge has turned his former show-business life into an entrepreneur. Jorge Perez currently resides in New York.

References

External links

 The Silenced History
 Alternativa Teatral
 
 Evelyn Biography by Susan Sarandon, December 2017
 Evelyn Video
 Evelyn Program
 Alternativa Teatral Video
 Jorge Perez Evelyn Life by Alfredo Maraw

Year of birth missing (living people)
Living people
Actresses from Buenos Aires
Vedettes (cabaret)
Argentine film actresses
Argentine vedettes
Argentine musical theatre actresses
Argentine musical theatre dancers
Argentine LGBT actors
Argentine musical theatre producers
Female impersonators
Vedettes